"Round Here" is a song by American rock band Counting Crows, released as the second single from their debut album, August and Everything After (1993), on June 20, 1994, by Geffen Records. The song's origin predates the formation of Counting Crows, when the band's future frontman Adam Duritz wrote the song with The Himalayans members Dan Jewett, Chris Roldan and Dave Janusko.

Despite not charting on the US Billboard Hot 100 due to rules in place at the time, "Round Here" peaked at number 31 on the Billboard Hot 100 Airplay chart and number seven on the Modern Rock Tracks chart. The song also reached the top 20 in Canada and Iceland, peaking at number six in the former country and number 12 in the latter. In April 2022, American Songwriter ranked the song at number five on their list of "The Top 10 Counting Crows Songs".

Song meaning

Duritz explained on VH1 Storytellers the meaning to the song: 

In a concert in Amsterdam for "This Desert Life", on October 17, 1999, Duritz adds,

Composition
The Counting Crows version (the more well-known recording) is a slow and mellow folk rock song. The original by the Himalayans is done in a more "pure" rock style—somewhat harder and faster, with prominent electric guitar and bass parts. In a tradition that has manifested in several Counting Crows songs, the two versions of this song feature somewhat different lyrics. Various live recordings of the song also feature significantly altered lyrics.

Track listings
UK CD single
 "Round Here" (LP version) – 5:28
 "Ghost Train" (LP version) – 4:01
 "The Ghost in You" (live) – 3:30

European and Australian CD single
 "Round Here" (LP version) – 5:28
 "Rain King" (live) – 5:12
 "The Ghost in You" (live) – 3:30

Charts

Weekly charts

Year-end charts

In popular culture
 Lyrics from the song are referenced by band The Gaslight Anthem in their song "High Lonesome" from the album The '59 Sound.
 Dustin Kensrue of the band Thrice has covered the song live.
 Kasey Chambers covered the song on her single "Nothing at All".
 Panic! at the Disco has covered this song live many times.
 David Ford occasionally plays this live.
 Josh Ramsay of the band Marianas Trench (band) has sampled this song live.

References

1994 singles
1994 songs
Counting Crows songs
Geffen Records singles
Song recordings produced by T Bone Burnett
Songs about suicide
Songs written by Adam Duritz
Songs written by Charlie Gillingham
Songs written by David Bryson